Aditya Kripalani (born 20 October 1981) is an Indian filmmaker, writer, musician and producer. He is best known for his books Backseat, Frontseat and Tikli and Laxmi Bomb

Aditya’s first two novels were called Back Seat and Front Seat respectively. His third novel was titled Tikli and Laxmi Bomb. 

The Asian Age says about Back Seat: “After you finish the book, you are bound to feel a vacuum in your heart as you will miss the characters and the city of Bombay.”

Dna India says about Front Seat “ Kripalani gets into his characters’ mind, speaks with their voice and sees with their eyes. As a result, we experience the world of bar dancing and dark alleys of Mumbai. The thread of realism, to which we were introduced in the first novel with Nikita, runs through this one too.”

The Sunday Guardian says about Tikli and Laxmi Bomb “ (Tikli and Laxmi Bomb) is neither wish fulfilment, feel-good literature nor a violence-fuelled revenge story, although it flirts briefly with the notion of being both, at various points in the book. Thankfully, it sticks to what it is at its heart: a gripping, no-holds-barred realist novel. As mentioned earlier in this review, it is rare to see genre fiction of this calibre coming out of India.”

.

He made his directorial debut in 2017 with the film Tikli and Laxmi Bomb which won the Best Feature Film at the 10th Berlin Independent Film Festival and the Best Film on Gender Equality at the 20th UK Asian Film Festival in London, both in 2018. The film also won Best Actress and Festival's choice Best Film award at the New Jersey Film Festival 2018 and Best Supporting Actor and Best Film at the Out of the Can Film Festival in Derby in 2018. The film is based on his third novel of the same title. The film released to wide acclaim on Netflix in all countries where English is one of the main languages. 

His second film titled Tottaa Pataaka Item Maal opened at the Garden State Film Festival in 2018 followed by the Kala Ghoda Film Festival and the UK Asian Film Festival. The independent film critic called it “the kind of brave filmmaking that improves lives and changes the world.”  again the film was released on Netflix in all English speaking countries. And stayed there for 3 years. 

Kripalani's third film, titled Devi Aur Hero won the prestigious NETPAC award for Best Film, at the 25th Kolkata International Film Festival in November 2019. The NETPAC jury, consisting of members from India, America and Spain, had the following citation for this award - “ an extremely sensitive exploration of mental disturbance and the ravages of addiction”
It released in Singapore for a period of two weeks in theatres in 2020 at The Projector. 

Aditya’s fourth feature film titled Not Today won the prestigious FIPRESCI international film critics award at the Bengaluru International Film Festival in 2022 and the Best film at the Uk Asian film festival in 2021 along with an honourable mention at the New jersey Film Festival in 2022. 

He has also worked as a writer and Creative Director in advertising with agencies such as Lintas, JWT Singapore, Leo Burnett, Kuala Lumpur and McCann Singapore. His novels, songs, ads and films all have a very clear attempt at shaping the world into a certain kind of place and are rife with an attempt to make sense of and challenge social issues.

References

External links

1981 births
Living people
Writers from Pune